David Despin is a French coach  and former rugby league footballer who represented France at the 1995 and 2000 World Cups.

Playing career
Despin played for the Villeneuve Leopards in French domestic tournaments. He first represented France in 1991. He remained part of the French squad for the rest of the decade, being selected in the 1995 and 2000 World Cup teams. In 1997 Despin was part of Frances nines squad that competed in the Rugby League World Nines tournament.

In 1996 he joined the new Paris Saint-Germain side in 1996's Super League I. After the season ended he returned to the Leopards and was part of their 2000 and 2001 Challenge Cup runs.

Despin later coached Villeneuve.

References

1975 births
Living people
French rugby league players
France national rugby league team players
Paris Saint-Germain Rugby League players
French rugby league coaches
Rugby league centres
Villeneuve Leopards coaches
Villeneuve Leopards players